Budhi Pind or Budi Pind is a very small village in Nakodar.  Nakodar is a tehsil in the city Jalandhar of Indian state of Punjab.

About 
Budhi Pind is almost 3 km from Nakodar. The nearest main road to Budhi Pind is the Mehatpur road. The nearest Railway station to this village is Nakodar Railway station which is approximately 3.1 km from it.

References

 Wikimapia website showing satellite view of Budhi Pind
   Official website of Govt. of India with Budi Pind's details

Villages in Jalandhar district
Villages in Nakodar tehsil